Miki may refer to:

Places
Miki, Hyōgo, a city in Hyōgo Prefecture, Japan
Miki, Kagawa, a town in Kagawa Prefecture, Japan
Miki, Azerbaijan, a village in Astara Rayon, Azerbaijan

People
Miki (given name)
Miki (surname)
Miki Núñez (born 1996), Spanish singer known by the mononym Miki

Other uses
SF-A2 Miki, a Vocaloid
Miki (noodles), or pancit miki, a type of egg noodles from the Philippines
Miki or omiki is a ritual offering of sake in the Japanese Shinto religion
Miki (Okinawa) a drink from Okinawa

See also 
Miki's Law, Kansas statutes
Mikki, a given name
Miku (disambiguation)
Myki (disambiguation)